The 2007–08 Football League (known as the Coca-Cola Football League for sponsorship reasons) was the 109th completed season of the Football League.

Changes from last season
As a result from last season, these are the changes from last season.

From Premier League
Relegated to Championship
 Sheffield United
 Charlton Athletic
 Watford

From Championship
Promoted to Premier League
 Sunderland
 Birmingham City
 Derby County

Relegated to League 1
 Leeds United
 Luton Town
 Southend United

From Football League One
Promoted to Championship
 Scunthorpe United
 Bristol City
 Blackpool

Relegated to League 2
 Bradford City
 Brentford
 Chesterfield
 Rotherham United

From Football League Two
Promoted to League 1
 Walsall
 Hartlepool United
 Swindon Town
 Bristol Rovers

Relegated to Conference National
 Boston United
 Torquay United

From Conference National
Promoted to League 2
 Dagenham & Redbridge
 Morecambe

Championship

Play-offs

Top scorers

League One

Play-offs

Top scorers

League Two

Play-offs

Top scorers

Notes
Leeds United were docked 15 points at the beginning of the League One season for failure to comply with rules on insolvency. As a part of this Leeds were given their golden share, allowing them to play in League One for the 2007–08 season.
Luton Town of League One were docked 10 points on Thursday 22 November 2007 for entering administration.
AFC Bournemouth of League One were docked 10 points on Friday 8 February 2008 for entering administration.
Rotherham United of League Two were docked 10 points on Tuesday 18 March 2008 for entering administration.

References

External links
The Football League
BBC Sport | Football | Tables 

 
English Football League seasons